Methylenedioxyphenylpropene (C10H10O2) can refer to either:

 Isosafrole
 Safrole